Pecchio is an Italian surname. Notable people with the surname include:

Daniel Pecchio (born 1947), American bass guitarist
Ted Pecchio, American bass guitarist, son of Daniel

Italian-language surnames